Sundown is a synonym for sunset.

Sundown may also refer to:

Places

Australia
 Sundown, Queensland, a locality in the Southern Downs Region
 Sundown National Park, Queensland, Australia

Canada
 Sundown, Manitoba, Canada, a small hamlet

United States
Sundown, Missouri, an unincorporated community
Sundown, New York, a hamlet
Sundown, Texas, a city
Sundown Township, Redwood County, Minnesota

Arts and entertainment

Film and television
Sundown (1924 film), a lost silent film starring Bessie Love
Sundown (1941 film), a film directed by Henry Hathaway
Sundown (2016 film), a Mexican-American film
Sundown (2021 film), a French-Mexican film
Sundown: The Vampire in Retreat (1991), a film starring David Carradine
"Sundown" (Lost), an episode of Lost

Music
Sundown (band), a late 1990s gothic metal band

Albums
Sundown (Gordon Lightfoot album)
Sundown (Richard Marx album)
Sundown, a 1979 album from Lonnie Donegan
Sundown (Rank and File album)
Sundown (Cemetary album)
Sundown (S Club 8 album)

Songs
"Sundown" (Gordon Lightfoot song)
"Sundown" (S Club 8 song)
"Sundown" (Six60 song)
"Sundown" (Fireball Ministry song)
"Sundown", a song by Hale from Above, Over and Beyond
"Sundown (Back in the Briars)", a song by Iron & Wine from Ghost on Ghost
"Sundown", a song by The Jesus and Mary Chain from Honey's Dead
"Sundown", a song by Starflyer 59 from The Fashion Focus
"Sundown", a song by Bruce Springsteen from Western Stars

Other
Sundown (video game), a cancelled video game
Sundown, a 1934 novel by John Joseph Mathews
Walker "Sundown" Calhoun, a character in the animated series C.O.P.S.
Sundown, call sign of a fighter pilot in the film Top Gun

Sports
Mamelodi Sundowns F.C., a South African team
Manzini Sundowns F.C., a Swazi team
Njube Sundowns F.C., a Zimbabwean team

See also 
Sundowner (disambiguation)
Sundowning (disambiguation)
Sundown town, all-white municipalities that prohibit black people from being in the town after sunset